Ratcliffe Stadium is a collegiate athletic venue in the western United States, located on the campus of Fresno City College in Fresno, California.

Opened  in 1926, it was renamed in 1941 after their first football coach, Emory Ratcliffe. The stadium hosted the Raisin Bowl  and was home to the Fresno State Bulldogs football team through 1979; they moved to their on-campus Bulldog Stadium in 1980.

Ratcliffe also hosted the West Coast Relays, a major track and field competition. Today, local high school football games and various track and field events are still held there. The stadium has a seating capacity of 13,000, and it is located at 1101 E. University Avenue, along Blackstone Avenue.

Historical events
On June 2, 1964, Fresno Mayor Wallace D. Henderson marched with Martin Luther King Jr. and 1,000 persons from Fresno High School march Ratcliffe Stadium, where about 3,000 persons attended a rally that he spoke at regarding fair housing, desegregation and the Rumford Housing Act and in protest of California Proposition 14 (1964). It was organized as the Witness of Faith for Freedom Rally.

See also
 Save Mart Center
 Chukchansi Park

References
 

American football venues in California
Athletics (track and field) venues in California
Fresno State Bulldogs football
Multi-purpose stadiums in the United States
NCAA bowl game venues
Sports venues completed in 1926
Sports venues in Fresno, California